St. Hebron is a small unincorporated community in Gadsden County, Florida, United States, which borders St. John, Scottown and Havana. St. Hebron, along with its neighboring communities, is located on the outside of the city limits of Quincy, between Quincy and Havana.

References

External links
Saint Hebron, Florida (Florida Hometown Locator)

Unincorporated communities in Gadsden County, Florida
Tallahassee metropolitan area
Unincorporated communities in Florida